Hierax may refer to:

 Hierax (Spartan admiral), Spartan commander in the Corinthian War
 Hierax (ascetic), learned Egyptian ascetic living during the 3rd century
 Antiochus Hierax, Seleucid prince
 Hierax (mythology), a Greek mythological figure

See also
 Greek ship Ierax